Geometric Shapes is a Unicode block of 96 symbols at code point range U+25A0–25FF.

U+25A0–U+25CF

The BLACK CIRCLE is displayed when typing in a password field, in order to hide characters from a screen recorder or shoulder surfing.

U+25D0–U+25FF

The CIRCLE WITH LEFT HALF BLACK is used to represent the contrast ratio of a screen.

Font coverage
Font sets like Code2000 and the DejaVu family include coverage for each of the glyphs in the Geometric Shapes range. Unifont also contains all the glyphs.  Among the fonts in widespread use, full implementation is provided by Segoe UI Symbol and significant partial implementation of this range is provided by Arial Unicode MS and Lucida Sans Unicode, which include coverage for 83% (80 out of 96) and 82% (79 out of 96) of the symbols, respectively.

Block

Emoji
The Geometric Shapes block contains eight emoji:
U+25AA–U+25AB, U+25B6, U+25C0 and U+25FB–U+25FE.

The block has sixteen standardized variants defined to specify emoji-style (U+FE0F VS16) or text presentation (U+FE0E VS15) for the
eight emoji.

History
The following Unicode-related documents record the purpose and process of defining specific characters in the Geometric Shapes block:

See also
 Unicode symbols
 Dingbat
 Box Drawing (Unicode block)
 Block Elements (Unicode block)
 Box-drawing character
 Tombstone (typography), the end of proof character
 Geometric Shapes Extended (Unicode block)
 Miscellaneous Symbols and Arrows (Unicode block) includes more geometric shapes
 Miscellaneous Symbols and Pictographs (Unicode block) includes several geometric shapes of different colors
 Mathematical operators and symbols in Unicode

References

Unicode blocks
Geometric shapes
Geometric